Kaiyang County is a county of central Guizhou province, China. It is under the administration of Guiyang City.

Transport
Kaiyang railway station is the terminus of the Guiyang–Kaiyang intercity railway, opened in 2015.

Climate

References

County-level divisions of Guizhou